Lancaster is a census-designated place (CDP) and the main village in the town of Lancaster in Coos County, New Hampshire, United States. The population of the CDP was 1,941 at the 2020 census, out of 3,218 in the entire town of Lancaster.

Geography
The CDP is in the west-central part of the town of Lancaster, on both sides of the Israel River just east of where it joins the Connecticut River. The CDP is bordered to the northwest by the Connecticut River, which forms the Vermont state line. To the north the CDP extends to Baker Pond and the location known as "Coos Junction". The CDP extends east to include all of the streets in the densely settled part of town, crossing Middle Street just west of Weeks Medical Center. The CDP includes all of Riverside Drive and Hartco Avenue on the southeast side of the village. To the west the CDP extends out Elm Street beyond Blackberry Lane.

U.S. Routes 2 and 3 run through the center of Lancaster as Main Street, splitting near the north and south ends of the CDP. US 2 leads east  to Gorham and west  to St. Johnsbury, Vermont. US 3 leads north  to Groveton and south  to Whitefield. New Hampshire Route 135 (Elm Street) leads southwest from Lancaster  to the outskirts of Littleton.

Demographics

As of the census of 2010, there were 1,725 people, 705 households, and 422 families residing in the CDP. There were 816 housing units, of which 111, or 13.6%, were vacant. The racial makeup of the town was 96.2% white, 0.5% African American, 0.9% Native American, 0.9% Asian, 0.1% Pacific Islander, 0.2% some other race, and 1.2% from two or more races. 2.5% of the population were Hispanic or Latino of any race.

Of the 705 households in the CDP, 30.8% had children under the age of 18 living with them, 42.4% were headed by married couples living together, 13.6% had a female householder with no husband present, and 40.1% were non-families. 32.1% of all households were made up of individuals, and 14.6% were someone living alone who was 65 years of age or older. The average household size was 2.30, and the average family size was 2.83.

23.7% of people in the CDP were under the age of 18, 7.5% were from age 18 to 24, 21.5% were from 25 to 44, 29.6% were from 45 to 64, and 17.7% were 65 years of age or older. The median age was 42.7 years. For every 100 females, there were 87.3 males. For every 100 females age 18 and over, there were 83.4 males.

For the period 2011–15, the estimated median annual income for a household was $57,589, and the median income for a family was $72,500. Male full-time workers had a median income of $40,449 versus $42,560 for females. The per capita income for the CDP was $29,302. 10.8% of the population and 3.0% of families were below the poverty line, along with 12.9% of people under the age of 18 and 18.8% of people 65 or older.

References

Census-designated places in New Hampshire
Census-designated places in Coös County, New Hampshire